Man entering a room is a Cubist painting from 1927 by Latvian painter Niklāvs Strunke.

Description
The painting is oil on canvas, with dimensions 92 x 86 centimeters.
The painting belongs to the Latvian National Museum of Art in Riga.

Analysis
The picture depicts a man who goes through a door beside him seen a small table and a light source in a half-empty room.

References 

1927 paintings
Paintings in Latvia
Latvian paintings